In complex analysis (a branch of mathematical analysis), the pseudo-zero set or root neighborhood of a degree-m polynomial p(z) is the set of all complex numbers that are roots of polynomials whose coefficients differ from those of p by a small amount. Namely, given a norm  on the space  of polynomial coefficients, the pseudo-zero set is the set of all zeros of all degree-m polynomials q such that  (as vectors of coefficients) is less than a given ε.

See also
List of complex analysis topics
Timeline of calculus and mathematical analysis

References

Complex analysis